The Perrie Award has been presented annually since 1995 by the Perrie Lectures Committee to the person who has done most to promote an understanding of the work of the Prison Service in England and Wales, and pushed forward the development of penal policy. The award and the associated lectures aim to improve the care of offenders and advance penal policy. The organising committee is made up of members from within the penal service (NOMS or National Offender Management Service) and from academia, charities and other fields.

The award and lecture programme were named in honour of Bill Perrie (1918–1997), regarded as one of the leading prison governors of his time.

Award winners

References

British awards
Penal system in England
Awards established in 1995
1995 establishments in the United Kingdom
Sociology awards
Criminology